Kismet is a 1967 American TV film. It is an adaptation of the musical Kismet directed by Bob Henry.

Cast
Jose Ferrer as Hajj
Anna Maria Alberghetti as Marsinah
George Chakiris as Caliph Abdullah
Barbara Eden as Lalume
Cecil Kellaway as Omar
Hans Conried as The Wazir Mansur

Production
It was produced by Norman Rosemont, who had produced the stage musical TV adaptations Brigadoon (1966) and Carousel (1967). He cast Ferrer after seeing him on stage in Man of La Mancha.

Reception
The Christian Science Monitor called it "solid cotton candy."

References

External links
Kismet at IMDb
Kismet at TCMDB

1967 television films
1967 films
American television films